Speechless is a 1994 American romantic comedy film directed by Ron Underwood. It stars Michael Keaton, Geena Davis (who also co-produced with her then-husband, director Renny Harlin), Bonnie Bedelia, Ernie Hudson, and Christopher Reeve.

Plot
After meeting each other for the first time in the gift shop of the Las Cruces, New Mexico hotel where they are both staying, insomniac writers Julia Mann and Kevin Vallick fight over the last box of sleep medicine.

Initially, they do not realise both are speechwriters for rival candidates in a New Mexico Senate election, so fall in love. Julia works for Democratic candidate Lloyd Wannamaker and Kevin for Republican candidate Ray Garvin. Inadvertently influencing each other's work, they discover each other's jobs when they are both invited to speak in a school. Both shocked, end up attacking one another verbally on stage. Later, in their campaign speeches they continue to argue, unbeknownst to everyone else. Their romance causes great confusion, as they have to decide if love and politics can mix.

Also complicating matters are, amongst other things, Kevin's cutthroat ex-wife Annette, who got Kevin the job on the Republican's campaign trail. Also Julia's estranged fiancé, "Mr. Flak Jacket," television war correspondent Robert "Baghdad Bob" Freed turns up and wants her back. She had broken off the engagement, as she believed he wanted a cheering section more than he wanted a wife.

Julia's organizer accidentally falls into Kevin's hands, and he hacks into her candidate's speech, making Wannamaker sound foolish. Then, Julia's team meets with his in his offices. He doesn't attend, but meets with her that night, where she tells him she's engaged again and he warns her she's getting fired. She takes advice from him to make her candidate more loved by the people by having him help rescue the missing bear cub, who's been dominating the news. This gives her a promotion to press secretary.

At the televised debates, Julia breaks off the engagement, and immediately after Kevin tells her he's crazy for her. They sneak off, spending the night together. The next morning at dawn, Annette shows up, tasking him to write a campaign ad. Not able to wake him, Julia writes a sitcom-style ad.

The next morning, Kevin chews Julia out because he thinks she leaked financial info to the press, not thanking her for the successful ad. Later on, one of her staff tells Kevin that both of their candidates took bribes, Proctor is responsible for both bribes, but has chosen Wannamaker. She is told by a workmate, as they approach the stage in victory.

Kevin arrives, interrupting Wannamaker's victory speech, to declare his love, swooping down into her arms. The film closes with a news report given by Bob of Julia's late entry into a senatorial race, with Kevin as campaign manager.

Context
The film was widely interpreted as an imitation of the contemporaneous, real-life romance of rival political consultants James Carville (key advisor to the first presidential campaign of Bill Clinton), and Mary Matalin (speechwriter for President George H. W. Bush).

However, co-lead actor Michael Keaton reported that the script had been developed before Carville and Matalin had ever met—though Keaton did admit to viewing The War Room, a documentary about Carville's work, to prepare himself for the film. Keaton came on board after dropping out of Batman Forever.

Cast
 Michael Keaton as Kevin Vallick
 Geena Davis as Julia Mann
 Bonnie Bedelia as Annette
 Ernie Hudson as Dan Ventura
 Christopher Reeve as Bob Freed
 Charles Martin Smith as Mike Kratz
 Gailard Sartain as Lee Cutler
 Ray Baker as Ray Garvin
 Mitchell Ryan as Lloyd Wannamaker
 Willie Garson as Dick
 Harry Shearer as Chuck
 Steven Wright as Eddie
 Jodi Carlisle as Doris Wind
 Jon Favreau as Debate Control Room Operator

Reception
The film received mostly negative reviews from critics. On Rotten Tomatoes the film has an approval rating of 10% based on reviews from 29 critics.
Audiences surveyed by CinemaScore gave the film a grade B on scale of A to F.

Roger Ebert of the Chicago Sun-Times gave it 2 out of 4, and wrote: "The level of humor is dialed safely down to the Sitcom setting, which limits what can happen, and how much we can care about it."
Gene Siskel, gave the film 1 out 4 and was critical of the lack of chemistry between the leads and the script, writing: "This script needed to be completely overhauled before filming began."

Brian Lowry of Variety wrote: "Never achieves the madcap hilarity of the '40s romantic comedies it seeks to emulate, and some of the dramatic moments feel a bit forced."

Marjorie Baumgarten of the Austin Chronicle gave a positive review and wrote: "It comes down to the charms of Keaton and Davis in the end. You like these characters and root for them to score."

Geena Davis was nominated for a Golden Globe Award for Best Actress – Motion Picture Musical or Comedy for her performance.

Box office
The film debuted at No. 5 in the United States and went on to gross $20.6 million. It grossed $25.1 million worldwide. In Latin America, several countries released the film with the title "No se tú", taking advantage of the 1992 hit by Mexican singer Luis Miguel, included in the soundtrack of the film.

Year-end lists
 Honorable mention – Michael MacCambridge, Austin American-Statesman
 8th worst – Desson Howe, The Washington Post

Soundtrack
The soundtrack included "House of Love" by Amy Grant and Vince Gill, "Born to Be Wild" by Steppenwolf, "Big Girls Don't Cry" by The Four Seasons, "Count Your Blessings" by Jack Sheldon, "Hit the Road Jack" by Ray Charles, "To Be Alone with You" by Bob Dylan, "Anything You Can Do" by Betty Hutton and Howard Keel, "Just in Time" by Tony Bennett, "Mi Tierra" by Gloria Estefan, "Sorry Seems to Be the Hardest Word" by Elton John, "No Sé Tú" by Luis Miguel, "All Shook Up" by Elvis Presley and "2 Sides", a track also present on James Armstrong's 2000 album, Got It Goin' On.

Marc Shaiman composed the score for the film and arranged "Count Your Blessings".

Further reading

References

External links
 
 
 
 
 
 

1994 films
1994 romantic comedy films
Metro-Goldwyn-Mayer films
Films directed by Ron Underwood
Films about elections
Films scored by Marc Shaiman
American romantic comedy films
1990s English-language films
1990s American films